Ben Cunningham (born 2003) is an Irish hurler. At club level he plays with St. Finbarr's and is also a member of the Cork senior hurling team.

Career

Cunningham began hurling at juvenile and underage levels with the St. Finbarr's club and was part of the club's minor team that won the Rebel Óg Premier 1 title in 2020. He was immediately drafted onto the club's senior team and established himself as their top scorer. Cunningham won a Cork PSHC title in 2022 after a defeat of Blackrock in the final.

Cunningham first appeared on the inter-county scene for Cork as a member of the minor team in 2020. He later progressed onto the Cork under-20 team and won an All-Ireland U20HC title after coming on as a substitute in the 4-19 to 2-14 defeat of Galway in the 2021 All-Ireland U20 final. Cunningham's club performances in 2022 earned a call-up to the Cork senior hurling team's pre-season training panel and he was included amongst the substitutes for the opening game of the 2023 Munster SHL. He earned a place on the starting fifteen for a subsequent National League game against Westmeath.

Personal life

Cunningham was born in Cork and attended Presentation Brothers College. He belongs to a family of hurlers; his father is Ger Cunningham, the former St. Finbarr's and Cork goalkeeper.

Career statistics

Club

Inter-county

Honours

St. Finbarr's
Cork Premier Senior Hurling Championship: 2022
Rebel Óg Premier 1 Minor Hurling Championship: 2020

Cork
All-Ireland Under-20 Hurling Championship: 2021
Munster Under-20 Hurling Championship: 2021

References

2003 births
Living people
St Finbarr's hurlers
Cork inter-county hurlers